Jimmy Connors was the defending champion but lost in the third round to José Higueras.

José Luis Clerc won in the final 6–3, 6–2 against Guillermo Vilas.

Seeds
A champion seed is indicated in bold text while text in italics indicates the round in which that seed was eliminated.

Draw

Finals

Top half

Section 1

Section 2

Bottom half

Section 3

Section 4

External links
 1981 ATP main draw 

Singles